Song of Spring may refer to:
 Song of Spring (1950 film), an Italian melodrama film
 Song of Spring (2022 film), a Chinese drama film